Field marshal (or General-fieldmarshal) was the highest military rank of the Russian Empire. It was a military rank of the 1st class in the Imperial Russian Army and equal to those of Chancellor and Active Privy Councillor, 1st class in civil service, and General Admiral in the Imperial Russian Navy. After the Russian Revolution of 1917 the rank was abolished, alongside the Table of Ranks. In 1935 however, the Red Army introduced the equivalent rank of "Marshal of the Soviet Union" as the highest military rank of the Soviet Union, when ranks were restored under Stalin's rule.

Russian field marshals 
The rank of field marshal was bestowed on the following 64 Imperial Russian Army officers:

Foreign field marshals 
The rank of field marshal was also bestowed on several foreign citizens:

See also 
 History of Russian military ranks
 Marshal of the Soviet Union
 Marshal of the Russian Federation

References 

Field marshals
Russia
 
Field marshals